James Charles Slattery (born August 4, 1948) is an American politician. He served in the U.S. House of Representatives from 1983 to 1995 representing Kansas's 2nd congressional district as a Democrat, was the Democratic nominee for governor in 1994 and was the Democratic candidate for U.S. Senator in 2008.

Early life, education, and early career 
After serving in the United States Army, Slattery earned a Juris Doctor (J.D.) from Washburn University School of Law in 1974. While at Washburn, he was a member of the Kansas Beta Chapter of Phi Delta Theta.  In 1982, Slattery was inducted into Washburn's prestigious Sagamore Society.

Prior to his election to the Congress, Slattery served in the Kansas House of Representatives, as a reserve Army officer and founded a successful real estate company.

U.S. House of Representatives

Elections
1982
Incumbent two term Republican Jim Jeffries of Kansas's 2nd congressional district decided to retire. Then-State Representative Slattery decided to run and defeated Republican nominee Morris Kay 57%-43%.

1984
He won re-election to a second term against Jim Van Slyke with 60% of the vote, winning every county except Clay.

1986–1990
Over the next few years, he won re-election with no problem in 1986 (71%), 1988 (73%), and 1990 (63%)/

1992
After redistricting, he represented more counties in the southeastern part of the state. He defeated Jim Van Slyke 56%-41%. He performed strongly in the northern part of the district, but did poorly in the southern part, mostly new territory for Slattery. He lost two counties: Coffey and Linn while winning five counties with less than a 50% majority: Wilson, Woodson, Allen, Bourbon, and Franklin counties.

Tenure
Slattery served in the U.S. House of Representatives from 1983 to 1995 in the Kansas delegation. 
He was a central player on many key issues, including environmental protection, health care, telecommunications, and budget cutting efforts. He worked to limit production of the B-2 bomber, and was the chief sponsor of the successful amendment to terminate spending on the Superconducting Super Collider in 1993.

Slattery gained success as a Democrat in a relatively conservative congressional district, Kansas's 2nd congressional district. He considered running for governor in 1990 against incumbent Gov. Mike Hayden, an unpopular governor following changes in property tax law. Slattery decided not to run in 1990, however, and Joan Finney became the first female governor of Kansas.

In 1993, Slattery orchestrated the House campaign that killed the Superconducting Super Collider. The SSC would have been about three times as powerful as CERN's Large Hadron Collider, most notable for discovering a particle consistent with a Higgs boson.

Committee assignments
Slattery served on the Energy & Commerce, Veterans' Affairs, Budget, and Banking Committees.

1994 gubernatorial election 

Finney served one term as governor, and Slattery decided to run for the open governorship in 1994, stepping down from Congress. However, he faced Republican Bill Graves. Slattery lost that race, a victim of the Republican landslide of 1994.

Post-congressional career

Law career
Slattery lived in Virginia and was partner in a Washington, D.C. law firm, Wiley Rein LLP after his defeat. In 2019, he left Wiley Rein, where he had worked for more than two decades, to start his own firm, Slattery Strategy.

Jim Slattery has been practicing law since 1975 and has advised domestic and international clients who have matters pending before the U.S. Congress, federal agencies and regulatory bodies. His extensive client list has included large publicly traded corporations and smaller family controlled businesses.  He has special experience in public policy matters related to health care, railroads, International trade, Ukraine and Iran.  Slattery maintains strong relations with senior Democratic leaders in the U.S. House and Senate.

He has also done various consulting and pro bono work, including successfully advocating for the release of a Princeton University student who had been imprisoned in Iran.

His youngest son, Mike Slattery, lives in Mission, Kansas. Mike was elected to the Kansas State House in 2008, defeating his Republican opponent Ronnie Metzker. Mike edged out fellow Democrat Andy Sandler by three votes in a hotly contested primary.

2008 U.S. Senate campaign

Slattery declared his intention to run for the United States Senate in March 2008 against incumbent Pat Roberts, and officially announced his run in a statewide tour on April 29.

Slattery was defeated by Roberts. The loss was the 25th consecutive setback for Democrats running for U.S. Senate seats from Kansas (24 regular elections plus a 1996 special election following the resignation of Bob Dole). The state last elected a Democrat in 1932, George McGill, who lost his re-election bid in 1938.

References

External links
Partner profile at Wiley Rein LLP
Jim Slattery for U.S. Senate 
 
Campaign contributions (2008) at OpenSecrets.org
Lobbyist profile at OpenSecrets.org

|-

|-

|-

1948 births
Democratic Party members of the United States House of Representatives from Kansas
Kansas lawyers
Living people
Democratic Party members of the Kansas House of Representatives
People from Atchison County, Kansas
Politicians from Topeka, Kansas
United States Army officers
Washburn University alumni
Members of Congress who became lobbyists